HSBA Hamburg School of Business Administration is a private business school located in Hamburg, Germany. Founded by Hamburg Chamber of Commerce in 2004, HSBA now cooperates with more than 300 companies. As a state-recognised third-level institution, it offers bachelor’s and master’s degrees in business as cooperative education (in German: "dual") and part-time courses for 1000 students. HSBA's Cooperative Education Model has its origin in Germany's dual education system which was applied to university level.

Structure

HSBA is composed of various departments and institutes:
 Departments: Strategy & Leadership, Marketing & Sales, Medien & IT, Maritime Business School, Finance & Accounting and Applied Economics.
 Institutes: Hamburg Institute of Family Owned Business, Hamburg Institute of Management and Finance, Hamburg Institute of Risk and Insurance, Hamburg Institute of Banking

Bachelor Programmes
HSBA offers five dual and one part-time Bachelor programmes:
 BSc Business Administration
 BSc Business Informatics
 BSc International Management
 BSc Logistics Management
 BA Insurance Management

The dual programmes are three year courses and have been developed together with the cooperating companies. According to the cooperative education model students spend alternate semesters of academic study with semesters of full-time employment in their company. Students receive a monthly salary, and most of the cooperating companies take over (part of) the tuition fees. Business Administration, Business Informatics and Media Management & Communication are taught partly in German (75%) and English (25%). International Management and Logistics Management are entirely taught in English.

Master Programmes
HSBA offers two Master programmes:
 MSc Business Development
 MSc Digital Transformation & Sustainability

Accreditations

HSBA's study programmes are accredited by the FIBAA Foundation for International Business Administration Accreditation. HSBA has also been granted higher educational accreditation by the German Council of Science and Humanities.

International Partner Institutions
HSBA cooperates with the following universities:
 IAE Business School (Buenos Aires/Argentina)
 MCI Management Center Innsbruck (Innsbruck/Austria)
 Haaga-Helia University of Applied Sciences (Helsinki/Finland)
 Novancia Business School (Paris/France)
 Edinburgh Napier University (Edinburgh/Great Britain)
 University of East London (London/Great Britain)
 Technological Educational Institute of Athens (Athens/Greece)
 Andrássy University (Budapest/Hungary)
 Budapest Business School (Budapest/Hungary)
 BI Norwegian Business School (Oslo/Norway)
 State University Higher School of Economics (St. Petersburg/Russia)
 Universidad de Almería (Almería/Spain)
 University of Dubai (Dubai/United Arab Emirates)
 De Paul University (Chicago/United States)

HSBA has been granted the Erasmus University Charta by the European Commission in 2009.

Extracurricular Activities

Since 2011 the annual HSBA Finance Conference has been organised and carried out by HSBA students as well.

Beyond that, HSBA offers several sport activities in particular Rowing and Field Hockey as well as numerous committees (HSBA Band, Consulting committee, International committee etc.)

Notable alumni
Leonie Hanne, German fashion influencer and blogger

External links 

 Official University Website
 Forbes Europe's Masters 2009

See also
 Education in Hamburg

References

Educational institutions established in 2004
Universities and colleges in Hamburg
Buildings and structures in Hamburg-Mitte
Business schools in Germany
2004 establishments in Germany